Shalmalee Desai (born 17 March 1989) is an Indian television writer and actress mainly known for the role of Sojal in the Hindi television show Iss Pyaar Ko Kya Naam Doon? Ek Baar Phir. She was the winner of the UTV Stars reality show Lux The Chosen One in 2012.

Early life and career
Born and brought up in Mumbai, Shalmalee worked with television channel Zee Marathi as a management trainee after completing an MBA from Welingkar College in 2011. Shalmalee is a trained Kathak dancer as well as a golfer.

After winning in the reality show Lux The Chosen One in 2012, she became the official face of UTV Stars channel for the year 2013. The same year, she secured her first television role in the television show Iss Pyaar Ko Kya Naam Doon? Ek Baar Phir. After completing a screenwriting course at Whistling Woods International Institute, she made her writing debut with popular television drama series Thapki Pyar Ki in 2016.

Personal life
In 2015, Desai married her Iss Pyaar Ko Kya Naam Doon? Ek Baar Phir co-star Avinash Sachdev. The couple divorced in 2017.

Television work

Actor

Writer

References

1989 births
Living people
Indian television actresses